Ematheudes straminella is a species of snout moth in the genus Ematheudes. It was described by Snellen in 1872, and is known from Angola, the Democratic Republic of Congo, Ghana, Kenya, South Africa and Uganda.

References

Moths described in 1872
Anerastiini
Moths of Africa